Rachel Moss is an actor who has starred on Off Broadway plays and TV shows. She has also appeared in commercials for Pepsi and Playhouse Disney.

Early life and education

Moss began her performance career in early childhood. She started dancing at age three. After entering acting at age five, Moss performed in a production of You're a Good Man, Charlie Brown. Four years later, she starred in The People Garden, an Off Broadway show.

During her years in middle school, Moss played the role of a young girl in Summer and Smoke at the Paper Mill Playhouse in Millburn, New Jersey. She graduated from Morristown-Beard School in Morristown, New Jersey in 2013 after receiving the senior theatre award. During her high school studies, Moss participated in the Crimsingers, the school's a cappella group, and on the forensics team. She also starred in the school's productions of Bat Boy: The Musical, A Midsummer Night's Dream, and Bye, Bye Birdie. In 2013, Morris Arts awarded Moss their Elaine Ehlers Arts Scholarship. Funding from the scholarship supported her college studies at Muhlenberg College in Allentown, Pennsylvania.

Acting career

During her acting career, Moss has made guest appearances on network TV series. She has appeared on One Life to Live on ABC-TV, Person of Interest on  CBS-TV, and 30 Rock on  NBC-TV. Moss also worked as the voice actor for the character Wiffle in the mini-series Wiffle and Fuzz on Playhouse Disney. She played the role of Miniature Girl in The Outskirts, a comedy film slated for release in November 2015. The film's plot involves outcasts in high school uniting against a common enemy.

References

American stage actresses
American television actresses
People from New Jersey
Living people
Morristown-Beard School alumni
Muhlenberg College alumni
Year of birth missing (living people)
21st-century American women